Pieve a Nievole is a comune (municipality) in the Province of Pistoia in the Italian region Tuscany, located about  northwest of Florence and about  southwest of Pistoia.  
 
Pieve a Nievole borders the following municipalities: Monsummano Terme, Montecatini-Terme, Ponte Buggianese, Serravalle Pistoiese.

References

External links

 Official website

Cities and towns in Tuscany